The Association of the Holy Family of Bordeaux was founded in France in 1820 by Pierre-Bienvenu Noailles, a canon of that city. His vision was to allow the expression of the Christian life in various forms.

The association is composed of:

Religious Sisters who perform active ministry in schools, hospitals and parishes.
Religious Sisters who live a contemplative way of life.
Women who belong to the Secular Institute of the Holy Family of Bordeaux.
Lay Associates, who are committed to supported the works of the Association.
Priest Associates, who cooperate in the work of the Association.

References

1820 establishments in France
Catholic organizations established in the 19th century
Secular institutes
Catholic teaching orders
Catholic female orders and societies
Catholic lay organisations